Danny Gold may refer to:

Danny Gold (journalist), American journalist and host for Vice News
Danny Gold, pseudonym of Ben Goldman used on the fake news website Liberty Writers News